Shaktiman is 1993 Hindi action film directed by K.C. Bokadia and starring Ajay Devgn, Karisma Kapoor, Mukesh Khanna, Kulbhushan Kharbanda. Other cast members include Gulshan Grover, Ajit Khan, Parikshat Sahni and Mahavir Shah.

Plot
Businessman Rai Bahadur Laxminarayan lives a wealthy lifestyle in Bombay along with his wife, Laxmi. Although they have been married for several years, they have no children. While on a trip to Simla, they get to adopt their servant, Diler's son, rename him Vicky, and bring him back home, much to the dismay of Diler's wife, Parvati. Sometime later, Laxmi gets pregnant and revisits Shimla, meets with an accident and passes away, leaving behind a new-born son, Amar. Diler wants to kill Amar, but Parvati wants to return him to Laxminarayan and runs away to Bombay. Diler informs his employer that both his wife and son have died and have been cremated. Diler relocates to Bombay, follows her but is unable to locate Parvati. She does reach Bombay along with Amar but she, in turn, is unable to locate Laxminarayan. Years later Amar has grown up, lives with Parvati in Versova, works as a Police Inspector in Sion Police Station and is in love with Priya, the Superintendent of Police's daughter, while Diler is a taxi-driver, and Vicky is an alcoholic and wants to wed Priya. Their lives will soon interline and become complicated with blackmail, deceit and murder.

Cast
Ajay Devgan as Amar Chauhan
Karishma Kapoor as Priya Vashisht
Kulbhushan Kharbanda as Rai Bahadur Laxminarayan
Mukesh Khanna as Diler
Parikshit Sahni as Police Superintendent
Gulshan Grover as Vicky Bose
Ajit as Shamsher Singh / Tiger
Mahavir Shah as Chhote
Tiku Talsania as Dimagchand
Anjana Mumtaz as Parvati
Beena Banerjee as Laxmi

Soundtrack
Sameer wrote all songs.

References

External links 
 

1993 films
1990s Hindi-language films
Films directed by K. C. Bokadia
Indian action drama films
Films scored by Channi Singh